Blogging in Bangladesh is dominated by a community of around 200 blogs. Some personal blogs have been around since the mid 2000s, but there are now blogs about self help, cities, science, law, digital marketing, entrepreneurship, and fashion magazines.

Notable bloggers 
Notable bloggers from Bangladesh include Avijit Roy, Asif Mohiuddin, Ahmedur Rashid Chowdhury, Ahmed Rajib Haider, Bonya Ahmed, Sunny Sanwar, Shahidul Alam.

Violence against bloggers 
Since 2013, some bloggers in Bangladesh have been attacked and killed by Islamic extremists.

References 

Blogging by country
Internet in Bangladesh
Mass media in Bangladesh